Ilija Ristanić (born 11 February 1986) is a Bosnian-Herzegovinian retired football midfielder.

Club career
Born in Brčko, SR Bosnia and Herzegovina, he started his career in 2004 playing with Belgrade's FK BASK, before moving, in January 2005, to play with HNK Orašje. In January 2008, he was transferred to Serbian First League club FK Rad where he played the rest of the season. In summer 2008, he was loaned to Premier League of Bosnia and Herzegovina club FK Modriča. Between January and June 2010 he played once more in Serbia, this time with FK Napredak Kruševac in the Serbian SuperLiga. In summer 2010 he returned to Bosnia signing with FK Sloboda Tuzla in the Premier League, but in the winter break he moved to his former club HNK Orašje.  In the winter break of the 2010-11 season, he joined Bosnian Premier League side NK Zvijezda Gradačac.

International career
Since 2007, he was part of the Bosnia and Herzegovina national under-21 football team.

References

External sources
 
 

1986 births
Living people
People from Brčko District
Serbs of Bosnia and Herzegovina
Association football midfielders
Bosnia and Herzegovina footballers
Bosnia and Herzegovina under-21 international footballers
FK BASK players
HNK Orašje players
FK Rad players
FK Modriča players
FK Napredak Kruševac players
FK Sloboda Tuzla players
NK Zvijezda Gradačac players
FK Jedinstvo Brčko players
Premier League of Bosnia and Herzegovina players
Serbian SuperLiga players
First League of the Republika Srpska players
Bosnia and Herzegovina expatriate footballers
Expatriate footballers in Serbia
Bosnia and Herzegovina expatriate sportspeople in Serbia